Peter Millowitsch is a German film and television actor. He is the director of the Volkstheater Millowitsch which he took over in 1999 following the death of his father Willy Millowitsch. His sister is the actress Mariele Millowitsch.

Selected filmography
 The Heath is Green (1972)
 Old Barge, Young Love (1973)
 Schwarzwaldfahrt aus Liebeskummer (1974)
 The Secret Carrier (1975)

Television roles
 Tatort ...und im Keller gärt es''

References

External links
 

1949 births
Living people
German male film actors
German male television actors
Actors from Cologne